Ben Aqua is an American multimedia artist, musician, and photographer based in Austin, Texas.

Early life 

Aqua was born in Brooklyn, New York. He studied graphic design at the University of Texas at Austin, where he developed his first solo music and performance art projects, ASSACRE and MVSCLZ, while organizing several DIY/avant-garde art and music events throughout Austin with the collective Totally Wreck Production Institute. Shortly after completing his degree, he began documenting his eccentric peers in photographic portraits involving "totally nonsensical, zany situations in beautifully/bizarrely decorated spaces".

Career 

In 2011, Aqua founded the experimental electronic music and art label #FEELINGS. The label produced early music releases by artists Lotic and Rabit, who later released official remixes for Björk in 2015.

Aqua released his debut EP Reset Yourself in 2013, which Interview Magazine described as "high energy and refreshingly difficult to define". He followed the EP with official remixes for YACHT and STRFKR, leading up to the 2014 release of his full-length album Virtual Anticipation, which VICE Thump described as having a "post-human outlook". His 2014 4C1D EP drew comparisons to Justin Timberlake and The Prodigy.

In 2013, Aqua created a graphic work depicting the words "NEVER LOG OFF" in a large, bold, and underlined font. The graphic spread widely across Tumblr, which led to his creation of a T-shirt featuring the design, distributed via #FEELINGS. The NEVER LOG OFF shirt garnered public interest and support from people all over the world, including celebrities such as Michael Stipe of R.E.M., Porter Robinson, and Casey Spooner of Fischerspooner. In 2015, Aqua accused clothing and accessories retailer Hot Topic of stealing the NEVER LOG OFF shirt concept.

In 2014, Aqua was invited by Resident Advisor to create a podcast to accompany an article written by Adam Harper entitled The online underground: A new kind of punk? The podcast (RA.434) was met with much criticism from conservative RA readers, mostly based on Aqua's open support of controversial label PC Music and artists such as A. G. Cook and Sophie. RA described Aqua as embodying "the online underground's attitude and approach". The podcast was chosen by FACT Magazine as their "Mix of the Week", calling it "a creative, enjoyable blend of...boundary-free dance oddness".

In 2015, Aqua collaborated with Ary Warnaar from Anamanaguchi on a song called Anarchy, which launched as an interactive website that Skrillex's label Nest HQ called "the cutest dismissal of authority you'll ever experience".

Discography

Albums 

 2014 - Virtual Anticipation - #FEELINGS
2018 - Chopin Preludes for Classical Synthesizer - Self-released

EPs & Singles 

 2009 - Feel Like Yourself Again (under the moniker MVSCLZ) - Self-released
2013 - Reset Yourself EP - #FEELINGS
 2014 - 4C1D EP - #FEELINGS
 2015 - Anarchy - Collaboration with Ary Warnaar (Anamanaguchi) - NHX
 2015 - Don't Play Dumb - #FEELINGS
 2015 - Ultimate Reality (YACHT Remix) - #FEELINGS
 2016 - Ultimate Reality EP - #FEELINGS
 2016 - By This River - #FEELINGS
 2017 - (Don't) Stop Haunting Me - Self-released

Remixes 

 2011 - Lotic - Rendez-vous (Ben Aqua Remix) - #FEELINGS
 2012 - Outlaw Producer - Ninjas (Ben Aqua Remix) - Kursed Recordings
 2012 - YACHT - Second Summer (Ben Aqua Remix) - DFA Records
 2013 - YACHT - Second Summer (Ben Aqua 3D Winter Remix) - DFA Records
 2013 - Feathers - Dark Matter (Ben Aqua Remix)
 2013 - STRFKR - Leave It All Behind (Ben Aqua Remix) - Polyvinyl Record Co.
 2013 - Chants - Don't Miss U (Ben Aqua Remix) - Hush Hush
 2014 - Balmorhea - Heir II (Ben Aqua Remix) - Western Vinyl
 2015 - Big Dipper - Vibin' (Ben Aqua Remix)
 2015 - Gillepsy - I'm Web (Ben Aqua Remix) - Hyperboloid Records
 2016 - TT The Artist - Lavish (Ben Aqua Remix) - Space Is The Place
 2016 - Joe Howe - MIDI Pile (Ben Aqua Remix) - #FEELINGS
 2017 - Anamanaguchi - Miku ft. Hatsune Miku (Ben Aqua Remix) - NHX
2018 - Fischerspooner - TopBrazil (Ben Aqua Remix) - Ultra Music

Production credits 

 2013 - Zebra Katz - Red River

Compilation appearances 

 2010 - Don't Play Dumb from V/A The Butt Bias Mixtape - BUTT Magazine, Honey Soundsystem Records
 2011 - Exterminate from V/A This Is So Random - Egyptian Maraccas
 2013 - 4C1D (BA Xmas 2.0 Remix) from V/A Christmas 2.0 - PC Music, Priz Tats
 2013 - Wanna Get Next 2 U from V/A FreshMoon Presents: 808K V.1 - Freshmoon
 2013 - Glass Of Shattered Glass from V/A ∜♡MDISCS 2K13 - AMDISCS
 2013 - Y U Mad from V/A Track Meet Compilation 02 - Track Meet
2016 - Reset Yourself, Don't Play Dumb, Ultimate Reality (YACHT Remix) from #FEELINGS Vol. 1 - #FEELINGS

References 

Living people
American electronic musicians
Year of birth missing (living people)